Wang Hongli (born 31 August 1997) is a Chinese speed skater. He competed in the 2018 Winter Olympics.

References

External links

1997 births
Living people
Speed skaters at the 2018 Winter Olympics
Chinese male speed skaters
Olympic speed skaters of China